Felipe Colombo Eguía (born January 8, 1983, in Mexico City, Mexico) is a Mexican-Argentine actor, singer and songwriter. He was part of the pop-rock band Erreway together with Camila Bordonaba, Benjamín Rojas and Luisana Lopilato.

Biography 
Felipe Colombo Eguía was born on January 8, 1983, in Hospital Angeles Mexico. He is the son of Argentine actor, Juan Carlos Colombo and Mexican actress, Patricia Eguía. He was raised in Mexico City, Mexico. He has an older sister called Sol. Felipe studied primary at escuela Hermino Almendro. He started high school at CIE Sur in Mexico and finished in Argentina at José Martí and San Francisco schools.

Career

Acting career 
Colombo made his television debut in the 1992 Televisa soap opera El abuelo y yo, co-starring Ludwika Paleta and Gael García Bernal, and made his film debut the same year with a performance in Sonata de luna.

Colombo then co-starred with Angélica María in the 1994 soap opera Agujetas de color de rosa, which was successful across Latin America and especially among Hispanic audiences in the United States. He appeared as Carlitos in the 1995 film Cilantro y perejil (Cilantro & Parsley), and in 1996 had a role in an episode of Mujer, casos de la vida real, a show hosted by legendary Mexican actress Silvia Pinal. In 1999 he acted alongside Anahí in the 1999 tele-novela Ángeles sin paraíso.

Chiquititas México (1998) 
In 1998 Colombo captured the role of Julio in the Mexican version of Chiquititas, originally an Argentine production.

Chiquititas (1999–2001) 
After the Mexican version flopped, Chiquititas author Cris Morena decided to give him a role in the original version, where he soon became one of the most popular actors. While performing in Chiquititas, Colombo worked for the first time alongside Benjamín Rojas, Luisana Lopilato and Camila Bordonaba, which would later on become part of another one of Colombo's highlights of his career as an entertainer. In 2001, Colombo reprised his character inChiquititas''' for the big screen version, Chiquititas: Rincón de luz.

 Rebelde Way and Erreway (2002–2007) 
Colombo secured the role of Manuel Aguirre in Rebelde Way in 2002. The show was nominated for the 2002 Martín Fierro Award for Best Telenovela. He starred alongside Benjamín Rojas, Luisana Lopilato and Camila Bordonaba. The four had previously worked together in Chiquititas and went on to form the band Erreway.

The band released three hit albums — Señales in 2002, Tiempo in 2003 and Memoria in 2004, had three successful tours Erreway en Grand Rex, Nuestro Tiempo and Gira 2004 and released a film in 2004, 4 Caminos. The film was based on their Rebelde Way characters: Manuel, Pablo, Mía and Marizza. The band split up soon after the release of their film and final album.

However, Camila Bordonaba, Benjamín Rojas and Felipe Colombo reunited in 2006 and released the compilation of the greatest hits, El Disco de Rebelde Way. Colombo and Bordonaba visited Spain during the promotional tour of the compilation. In 2007 Lopilato left Erreway, and the remaining three released a live hits collection Erreway presenta su caja recopilatoria, held a short tour in Spain, and confirmed the release of the band's fourth album, Vuelvo.

 Recent and future projects (2004–present) 
After his acclaimed role in Rebelde Way, Colombo appeared as Miki in another production of Cris Morena, the 2004—2005 telenovela Floricienta. He also got a lot of attention playing the lead in the theatrical version of The Graduate, alongside Nacha Guevara. In 2006, Colombo portrayed deceased Nirvana frontman Kurt Cobain in the stage play No te preocupes ojos azules. He also portrayed Pastor in 2006 hit television drama Doble Vida and appeared in one episode of Amor Mío.

In 2007 Colombo captured the role of Lucho Fierro on Martín Fierro Awards—nominated television comedy Son de Fierro. He worked alongside Camila Bordonaba for the sixth time in his career. He was seen in two films in 2008 Fantasma de Buenos Aires and Solos en la ciudad, alongside his Rebelde Way co-star Sabrina Garciarena.

In 2011–2012, his role is Bernardo Berlanga in Herederos de una venganza and 2012 he made Host TV debut in La vuelta al mundo together with the actress Isabel Macedo.

In 2013, he was part of the miniseries Inconsistente colectivo.

In 2014, he returned to television to play Fidel in Mis amigos de siempre.

In 2016, he starred in the play Cardenio.

 Musical career 
During the development of Rebelde Way, Felipe Colombo and his co-stars: Luisana Lopilato, Benjamín Rojas and Camila Bordonaba have become the members of the band Erreway. They immediately reached worldwide popularity, especially in Latin America, Spain, Europe and Israel. All their studio albums, Señales (2002), Tiempo (2003) and Memoria, reached Platinum certification. The band broke up at the end of 2004 and reunited again in 2006 except Luisana Lopilato to tour Spain. In 2007, they did a concert in Valencia for Sunny Happy Day and received the Platinum Record for the 80,000 copies sold of his album Erreway, el disco de Rebelde way. In 2010, he formed a new band, La Miss Tijuana with his friend Camila Bordonaba and Erreway's vocal coach, Willie Lorenzo. In 2013, he formed a new band, Roco with his friend Benjamín Rojas and Erreway's vocal coach, Willie Lorenzo.

 Personal life 
From 2000 to 2004, Felipe Colombo was in a relationship with his co–star the actress, Luisana Lopilato.

From 2005 to 2006, Felipe Colombo was in a relationship with the model, Cecilia Bonelli.

Since 2007, Felipe Colombo has been in a relationship with Cecilia Coronado, a costume designer whom he met in the recordings of Son de Fierro. On November 3, 2009, the couple's first child, a girl, was born whom, they called Aurora Colombo.

Felipe has a very close relationship with his former colleagues from Erreway, Camila Bordonaba and Benjamín Rojas who are also his daughter's godparents.

 Filmography 
 Theater 

 Television 

 Movies 

 Television programs 

 Discography 
 Soundtrack albums 

 1999 —  Chiquititas Vol. 5 2000 — Chiquititas Vol. 6 2001 — Chiquititas Vol. 7 2001 — Chiquititas: Rincón de Luz Erreway 

 2002 — Señales 2002 — Erreway en Grand Rex 2003 — Tiempo 2003 — Nuestro Tiempo 2004 — Nuestro Tiempo 2004 — Memoria 2004 — Gira 2004 2006 — El Disco de Rebelde Way 2006 — Erreway en Concierto 2007 — Erreway presenta su caja recopilatoria 2007 — Erreway en España 2007 — Vuelvo La Miss Tijuana 
 2010 — Sólo Me Salva Amar 2010 — Vuelvo 2011 — Deja que llueva 2011 —  3 iguanas Roco 
 2013 — Pasarán años 2013 — Como baila la novia 2013 — Gira 2013 — Quien se ha tomado todo el vino 2013 — Tornado''

Notes

References

External links
 
 
 http://www.novebox.com/series/rebelde-way-temporada1/88108
 http://www.novebox.com/series/rebelde-way-temporada2/91392

1983 births
Living people
Male actors from Mexico City
Mexican people of Argentine descent
Mexican emigrants to Argentina
Mexican male child actors
Argentine male child actors
Mexican male television actors
Argentine male television actors
Argentine male film actors
Mexican male film actors
Argentine male stage actors
Mexican male stage actors
Mexican male models
Naturalized citizens of Argentina
Mexican expatriates in Argentina
21st-century Argentine male singers
21st-century Mexican male singers
Participants in Argentine reality television series
Bailando por un Sueño (Argentine TV series) participants